National Highway 365B, commonly called NH 365B is a national highway in  India. It is a spur road of National Highway 65.  NH-365B traverses the state of Telangana in India. It starts at Suryapet and ends at Sircilla. Major cities on this route are Suryapet, Jangaon, Siddipet and Sircilla.

Route 
Suryapet, Arvapally, Phanigiri, Thirumalagiri, Jangaon, Duddeda, Siddipet, Sircilla.

Junctions  
 
  Terminal near Suryapet.
  near Aravpally and Vangamarthy.
  near Jangaon.
Terminal with Telangana State Highway 11 at Sircilla.

See also 
 List of National Highways in India by highway number
 List of National Highways in India by state

References

External links 
 NH 365B on OpenStreetMap

National highways in India
National Highways in Telangana